With a height of 260.5 m (855 ft) Tehri Dam is the tallest dam in India and 12th tallest dam in the world. It is a multi-purpose rock and earth-fill embankment dam on the Bhagirathi River in New Tehri, Tehri Garhwal district in Uttarakhand, India. It is the primary dam of the THDC India Ltd. and the Tehri hydroelectric complex. Phase 1 was completed in 2006. The dam's 1,000 MW variable-speed pumped-storage scheme is currently under construction with expected commissioning of first two units in 2023.

History

A preliminary investigation for the Tehri Dam Project was completed in 1961 under Jawahar lal Nehru's ministry's and its design was completed in 1972 with a 600  MW capacity power plant based on the study. Construction began in 1978 after feasibility studies but was delayed due to financial, environmental and social impacts.

In 1986, technical and financial assistance was provided by the USSR, but this was interrupted years later with political instability. India was forced to take control of the project and at the first, it was placed under the direction of the Irrigation Department of Uttar Pradesh. However, in 1988 the Tehri Hydro Development Corporation was formed to manage the dam and 75% of the funding would be provided by the federal government, 25% by the state. Uttar Pradesh would finance the entire irrigation portion of the project.

Technical description

The installed hydrocapacity is 1,000 MW along with an additional 1,000 MW of pumped storage hydroelectricity. The lower reservoir for the pumped-storage plant is created by the Koteshwar Dam downstream.

The Tehri Dam and the Tehri Pumped Storage Hydroelectric Power Plant are part of the Tehri Hydropower Complex which also includes the 400 MW Koteshwar Dam. Tehri pumped storage plant (4 X 250 MW)  has variable speed features which can optimize the round trip efficiency under varying water levels in its reservoirs. Power is distributed to Uttar Pradesh, Uttarakhand, Punjab, Delhi, Haryana, Jammu and Kashmir, Chandigarh, Rajasthan and Himachal Pradesh .

The total expenditure for this project was US$1 billion.

Scheduling and generation dispatch
The scheduling and dispatch of the Tehri Hydro Power plant is done by Northern Regional Load Dispatch Center (NRLDC), which is the apex body to ensure the integrated operation of the power system grid in the Northern region and comes under Power System Operation Corporation Limited (POSOCO). At present, THDC India Ltd. is generating around 3,000 GWh annually from this dam.

Environmental issues

The Tehri Dam has been the object of protests by environmental organizations and local people of the region. Virendra Dutt Saklani, lawyer and founder of the Anti-Tehri Dam Struggle Committee, was quick to point out the consequences associated to the large project. Environmental activist Sunderlal Bahuguna led the Anti-Tehri Dam movement from 1980s till 2004. The protest was against the displacement of town inhabitants and environmental consequence of the weak ecosystem.

In addition to the human rights concerns, the project has spurred concerns about the environmental consequences of locating such a large dam in the fragile ecosystem of the Himalayan foothills. There are further concerns regarding the dam's geological stability. The Tehri dam is in the Central Himalayan Seismic Gap, a major geologic fault zone. This region was the site of a 6.8 magnitude earthquake in October 1991, with an epicenter  from the dam. Dam proponents claim that the complex is designed to withstand an earthquake of 8.4 magnitude, but some seismologists say that earthquakes with a magnitude of 8.5 or more could occur in this region. Were such a catastrophe to occur, the potentially resulting dam-break would submerge numerous towns downstream, whose populations total near half a million.

The relocation of more than 100,000 people from the area has led to protracted legal battles over resettlement rights and, ultimately, resulted in the project's delayed completion.

Since 2005, filling of the reservoir has led to the reduced flow of Bhagirathi water from the normal  to a mere . This reduction has been central to local protest against the dam, since the Bhagirathi is considered part of the sacred Ganges whose waters are crucial to Hindu beliefs. At some points during the year, the tampering with Bhagirathi waters means this tributary stops flowing. This has created resentments among many Hindus, who claim that the sanctity of the Ganges has been compromised for the generation of electricity. The officials say that when the reservoir is filled to its maximum capacity the flow of the river will again become normal. In spite of concerns and protestation, operation of the Tehri Dam continues.

NTPC Limited Takeover
On 21 November 2019, the Government of India approved the take over of Tehri Hyrdo Development Corporation (THDC) by NTPC Limited.

References 

 Official website of the Tehri Hydro Development Corporation Limited, the organization in charge of the dam's construction
 Tehri: The Sinking Town a traveller's account of Tehri dam.
 Tehri Lake: Memories from Old Tehri, A Backpacker at Tehri Lake
 Gaur, Vinod K. and Valdiya, K. S. (1993) Earthquake Hazard and Large Dams in the Himalaya, Indian National Trust for Art and Cultural Heritage, New Delhi, 
 Nawani, PC et al. (2006) "TEHRI DAM PROJECT – A Geotechnical Appraisal," Geological Survey of India Bulletin: Series B, No.62,

External links

Tehri Hydro Power Complex on the Bhagirathi River in India Journal Power Technology and Engineering (formerly Hydrotechnical Construction), Springer, New York  (Print)  (Online) Vol. 34, No. 8-9 / Aug, 2000 , pp 479–484, 2 November 2004

Dams completed in 2009
Energy infrastructure completed in 2006
Dams in Uttarakhand
Hydroelectric power stations in Uttarakhand
India–Soviet Union relations
New Tehri
Pumped-storage hydroelectric power stations in India
Embankment dams
Dams on the Bhagirathi River
2006 establishments in Uttarakhand
Renewable energy
Rivers of Uttarakhand
Rigvedic rivers
Rivers of India
Ganges
Tehri Garhwal district